The George and Mary Foster Anthropology Library is one of the subject specialty libraries at University of California, Berkeley, and is one of only three anthropology libraries at American research universities. The other two are at Harvard and the University of Pennsylvania. All three universities have specialized anthropology libraries and museums in support of their anthropology departments.

History
The Anthropology Museum and anthropology department at UC Berkeley were founded in 1901, followed by a small departmental library established before 1909.

Yet "when I came to Berkeley in 1948, there was no Anthropology Library,” professor John Rowe wrote. Rowe found it difficult to access anthropology books scattered throughout the Main library, and so established a one-room anthropology library in the department's new temporary quarters. The two-floor anthropology library was eventually established in Kroeber Hall in 1959.

Rowe goes on to say that anthropology students finally got their own space in Kroeber in 1959.

According to LibraryThing: 
The Anthropology Library at Berkeley was established in 1956 as a separate branch of the UC Berkeley libraries. It moved to its current location in Kroeber Hall in 1959. In 1997, the library was named for Berkeley anthropologists George & Mary Foster."

Renaming
The UC Berkeley anthropology library was renamed after Berkeley anthropologists George and Mary Foster in 1997.

Occupy Cal in the Anthropology Library, 2012
When the campus threatened to close specialized libraries in 2012, Occupy Cal led the UC Berkeley Anthropology Library Occupation 2012. Forming a “study-in” of the Anthropology Library for three days and two nights of January 19–21, the group issued demands to the university administration, saying:

“We chose to occupy this space because the Anthropology library is a recent victim of extreme service cuts. The hours of operation are being cut from the previous, already slim, 9am-6pm to the current 12pm-5pm… We call on the administration to take immediate action to hire another full-time librarian… Why have the UC Regents continued to approve 21% increases in administration salaries, while students are being denied access to their libraries?”

Protests at the Anthropology Library, 2022
On February 28, 2022 the UC Berkeley Library announced that it was closing the Foster Anthropology Library indefinitely, due to "severe and sustained staffing shortages." This decision was reversed after 40 students and faculty organized to protest the closure, although "a librarian will no longer be available. Students will not be able to check out materials or receive research assistance."

Collections
As of 2009, the Anthropology Library has over 80,000 volumes of books and bound journals., comparable to Harvard's Tozzer Anthropology Library, which now holds 80,000 volumes, and more off-site.

The Foster Library collects books in the four fields of anthropology, including cultural anthropology, biological anthropology, linguistic anthropology, and archaeology, especially on California and Latin American populations.

Librarians
An anonymous donor endowed the John H. Rowe Librarian position in the anthropology library in 1998. 

Alfred L. Kroeber
Pliny Earle Goddard (  -1909)
John Howland Rowe (1950s)
Dorothy A. Koenig (1972-1994)
Suzanne Calpestri (1994-2008)
Kathleen Gallagher (2008-2012)
Susan Edwards (2013-2015)
Celia Emmelhainz (2015-2022)

Other Anthropology Libraries
There are three prominent anthropology libraries at US research universities: 
The Foster Anthropology Library at UC Berkeley collects in anthropology and archaeology, with a focus on California and first cultures of the Americas, and is located near the Phoebe A. Hearst Museum of Anthropology at UC Berkeley.

The Tozzer Library at Harvard collects in anthropology and archaeology, focused on Mesoamerican archaeology and indigenous peoples of the Americas. This includes personal libraries of several notable researchers, and subscriptions to 2,000 journals and serials. It works with the 
Peabody Museum at Harvard.

The Museum Library at U Penn is connected to the University of Pennsylvania Museum of Archaeology and Anthropology and collects in anthropology, archaeology, and related disciplines such as folklore, linguistics, museology, museum conservation, and ethnographic art.

Notes

See also
 
 University of California, Berkeley Libraries

University of California, Berkeley
University and college academic libraries in the United States
Libraries in Alameda County, California
1956 establishments in California
Tourist attractions in Berkeley, California